Loredana Padoan (19 March 1924 – 18 January 2016), best known just as Loredana, was an Italian film and stage actress.

Life and career 
Born in Venice, after completing her scuola magistrale studies, Loredana enrolled at several acting schools, determined to pursue a career as an actress.

Following several secondary roles, she had her breakout in 1942, with the lead role in the drama film La signorina. She later specialized in adventure films and melodramas. She significantly slowed her activities after the war, until her marriage to a Roman antique dealer and her subsequent retirement in the late 1940s.

Selected filmography 
 Department Store (1939)
 The King's Jester (1941)
 Idyll in Budapest (1941)
 La signorina (1942)
 Forbidden Music (1942)
 The Son of the Red Corsair (1943)
 Measure for Measure (1943)
 La Fornarina (1944)
 The Devil's Gondola (1946)
 Immigrants (1948)

References

External links 
 

 
 
Actors from Venice
1924 births  
2016 deaths  
Italian stage actresses
Italian film actresses 
20th-century Italian actresses